Lisa Loomer (born 1950) is an American playwright and screenwriter who has also worked as an actress and stand-up comic. She is best known for her play The Waiting Room (1994), in which three women from different time periods meet in a modern doctor's waiting room, each suffering from the effects of their various societies' cosmetic body modification practices (foot binding, corsetry, and breast implantation). She also co-wrote the screenplay for the film Girl Interrupted. Many of her plays deal with the experiences of Latinas and immigrant characters. Others deal with social and political issues through the lens of contemporary family life. Beyond that, Loomer's play The Waiting Room discusses issues such as body image, breast cancer, and non-Western medicine.

Early life 
Lisa Loomer was born in New York and moved to Mexico with her family in her late teens. She is of Spanish and Romanian ancestry. Loomer studied theatre at Brandeis University and New York University's Tisch School of the Arts.

Career 
Lisa Loomer began her career as an actress and comedienne. Her first work for theater was A Crowd of Two at the American Place Theatre. This was followed by a one-woman show, All By Herselves, at the Westside Arts Theatre. She began writing plays at the Intar Playwrights Lab, under the direction of Maria Irene Fornes. Her first play Birds was produced by South Coast Rep.

Lisa Loomer’s play Roe, about Roe v. Wade, was originally commissioned through the Oregon Shakespeare Festival's American Revolutions program. It was first produced at OSF in a production that traveled to Arena Stage and Berkeley Rep. It received the Jane Chambers Playwriting Award and the Pen Award.

Her play Homefree was commissioned and developed at Denver Center Theater Company before receiving its world premiere in Los Angeles at the Road Theatre.

Café Vida, about female gang members, was presented at the Los Angeles Theatre Center by the Cornerstone Theatre Company in partnership with Homeboy Industries, and was nominated for an Ovation Award for Best Play.

Two Things You Don't Talk About at Dinner had its world premiere at the Denver Center for the Performing Arts.

Distracted had its world premiere at the Mark Taper Forum and was subsequently produced at the Oregon Shakespeare Festival. The play was produced at the Roundabout Theatre Company in New York in a production starring Cynthia Nixon and has subsequently been produced in theatres throughout the U.S.

Living Out had its world premiere at the Mark Taper Forum and was produced at the Second Stage Theater in New York. It has been produced at such theaters as Seattle Rep, Milwaukee Rep, The Denver Center, and Theatreworks, often in bi-lingual productions, as well as in Israel, Europe, and Mexico.

Her play The Waiting Room went from the Williamstown Theater Festival to the Mark Taper Forum to highly successful productions at Arena Stage and Trinity Rep, and then to the Vineyard Theatre in New York. It has been widely produced nationally and internationally.

Expecting Isabell had its world premiere at Arena Stage and its west coast premiere at the Mark Taper Forum. It has been produced in New York and nationally.

Bocón!, a political fable for young audiences, began at the Taper and has been seen throughout the country, from the Kennedy Center, to Seattle’s Group Theater and the La Jolla Playhouse, as well as in Germany, Alaska, and Mexico.

For the Cornerstone Theatre Company, she also wrote Broken Hearts, produced at the Los Angeles Theatre Center.

Other plays by Loomer which have been performed publicly include Maria, Maria, Maria, Maria! (Mixed Blood), Accelerando (Odyssey Theatre Ensemble), and Looking for Angels (The Public Theater).

Loomer is an alumna of New Dramatists and the recipient of two grants from the National Endowment for the Arts and a grant from the New York Foundation for the Arts. Awards include the Jane Chambers Award (twice), the Susan Smith Blackburn Prize, the Kennedy Center Fund for New American Plays Award, a Garland Award, a Lurie Foundation Award, an Ovation Award, and the American Theatre Critics Association Award (twice). She has also received an Imagen Award for positive portrayals of Latinos in all media. Her plays have been selected for the Otis Guernsey Jr./Burns Mantle anthologies The Best Plays of 1994–1995, The Best Plays of 1998–1999, and The Best Plays of 2003-2004. Loomer's works have been published by Dramatists Play Service, TCG, Dramatic Publishing, and Arte Publico Press. Roe, The Waiting Room, and Living Out are widely taught in university drama programs, Women's Studies programs, and Latino Studies programs.

Loomer also writes for film and television, both comedy and drama. She was a supervising producer for the second season of Love Is… on OWN. Her films include Girl Interrupted, and Nappily Ever After for Netflix. Loomer has written TV pilots for HBO, CBS, Fox, and Showtime.

Awards
Loomer has won the Jane Chambers Playwriting Award (in 1994 for The Waiting Room), the Susan Smith Blackburn Prize, the Kennedy Center Fund for New American Plays Award, a Back Stage West Garland Award for Playwriting (in 2003 for Living Out), the Imagen Award for positive portrayals of Latinos in all media, and American Theatre Critics Association Steinberg New Play Award (in 1995 for The Waiting Room and in 1999 for Expecting Isabel.) She was also the recipient of two grants from the National Endowment for the Arts, and one from the New York Foundation for the Arts, and was nominated for a Pulitzer Prize.

Select plays

References

Living people
1950 births
Writers from New York City
American women screenwriters
20th-century American dramatists and playwrights
Screenwriters from New York (state)
American women dramatists and playwrights
American people of Spanish descent
American people of Romanian descent
20th-century American women writers
21st-century American women